Lakatoi (also Lagatoi) are double-hulled sailing watercraft of Papua New Guinea.
They are named in the Motu language and traditionally used in the Hiri trade cycle.

Gallery

See also
Crab claw sail

References

Multihulls
Water transport in Papua New Guinea